Aron J. Warner is an American film producer and voice actor who's best known for producing the Shrek films. He was known as the first person to win the Academy Awards Best Animated Feature Film.

Life and career 
Warner joined PDI/DreamWorks in 1997 to serve as a producer on the computer animated hit Antz, which marked the first collaboration between PDI and DreamWorks. Warner went on to become head of PDI/DreamWorks from 2000 to 2002. Warner had previously held the post of vice president of production at Twentieth Century Fox, where he supervised production on such films as Independence Day, The Ice Storm, The Crucible, Alien Resurrection and Titanic.

A graduate of UCLA Film School, Warner started out as a production coordinator at Empire Pictures, gaining experience on low-budget horror and science-fiction films. He then moved on to a position at Film Finances, a completion bond company, where he worked on more than 50 films.

Warner began his career as a producer on the horror hit Freddy's Dead: The Final Nightmare. He then served as supervising producer on John Dahl's Red Rock West, before beginning his relationship with Twentieth Century Fox as the line producer on Rachel Talalay's Ghost in the Machine. He later executive produced Tank Girl, also directed by Talalay. In addition, he oversaw production on James Cameron's film True Lies.

He executive produced Shrek Forever After, along with Andrew Adamson and John H. Williams.

Filmography

Film

Television

References

External links
 

American film producers
Living people
Producers who won the Best Animated Feature Academy Award
UCLA Film School alumni
Place of birth missing (living people)
DreamWorks Animation people
Sony Pictures Animation people
1961 births